Victoria Upper Névé is a névé with an area of c. 15 square mile at the head of the Victoria Upper Glacier in Victoria Land. The névé lies between the Clare Range and the Cruzen Range eastward of The Fortress. Named by the Advisory Committee on Antarctic Names in 2005 in association with the Victoria Upper Glacier.

References

Glaciers of Victoria Land
Névés of Antarctica